Beaufortain is a valley in the Savoie department in the Auvergne-Rhône-Alpes region in Southeastern France. It extends around the commune of Beaufort.

See also 
 Beaufortain Massif

External links 
 Official website of Beaufortain

References

Valleys of France
Landforms of Auvergne-Rhône-Alpes